Father Michael Goetz Secondary School (sometimes referred to as Goetz or abbreviated as FMG; Goetz pronounced as "Gates") is a Catholic school located in Mississauga, Ontario,     Canada. Founded by Ed King, it was established in 1987 (in its original location on Hollymount Drive) and in 1990 moved to the south of the city centre. The school was named after King's friend, Father Michael Goetz. Father Michael Goetz is the closest high school to the city centre. Father Michael Goetz is known for its exceptional sports teams, as well as the city's best technological education programs, including computer science, computer engineering, construction technology and automotive technology. Father Michael Goetz offers two SHSM (Specialist High Skills Major) programs, one for Information and Communications Technology (ICT) and the other for Arts and Culture.

Students
The school has one of the highest populations of English-as-a-second-language students in the school district.

Academics
Students go through four years of schooling and the school offers a range of subjects at different levels of difficulty.

The curriculum includes 13 areas of study for the 2020-2021 year in the arts, business, languages, science, mathematics, and technology. Father Michael Goetz specializes in technological education, including Computer Engineering, Computer Science, Communications Technology, Technological Design, Automotive Technology, Construction Technology, Woodworking, and Cosmetology. Father Michael Goetz also offers a robust Arts and Culture program including Dance, Music, Drama, and other specialized performing arts courses. Other programs offered at Goetz include Hospitality and Tourism, International Business studies including Accounting, Marketing, International Business, Entrepreneurship, and more. Goetz also offers religious studies including World Religions, Philosophy, and Christ and Culture. Goetz offers advanced English, and offers French, Mathematics, Sciences, and Canadian and Political studies. Goetz runs Political Science and Canadian Studies, Canadian Law, International Law, and Political Science courses. Father Michael Goetz offers a diverse set of courses for students to pick from.

Specialist High Skills Major Programs 
Father Michael Goetz is home to two Specialist High Skills Major programs, both up to date with the constant changing trades climate. Goetz offers the Information and Communications Technology (ICT) and Arts and Culture programs.

Spiritual development
Before the start of school each day, morning prayer is conducted in the school chapel. Masses are held on special days at the Christ the King Church and in the school cafeteria or gym. The special days are the opening of the school year, Thanksgiving, Christmas, Ash Wednesday, Easter and the closing of the school year. Opportunities are also given to the students for public prayer, reconciliation, retreats and alms giving.

2007 Censorship row
In January 2007 a row broke out when the award-winning novel Snow Falling on Cedars by David Guterson was pulled from library shelves and classrooms, despite being used in the Grade 11 curriculum, after one parent objected that it contained sexually explicit text. The context in question contains a few explicit passages, including a married couple's first sexual encounter, as well as sexual relations between two youths. According to the Mississauga News, "a representative of Random House in Canada said the company hadn't heard any complaints about the book this side of the border. In the U.S., though, it has been the subject of controversy and bans, not just for the sexual content but also for its violence and exploration of racial issues." The book was restored in February following a review by a committee of trustees and curriculum experts. Many critics of the board's move argued that the content pales compared to media images to which high school students are exposed to on a daily basis.

Athletics
The school is a member of the Region of Peel Secondary School Athletic Association.

The girls basketball team was recognized as "high school team of the year" in 2007, after going undefeated over the previous four seasons with a 46–0 record.

History
The school was founded by Ed King, who was also the first principal.

As the school was being planned and built, the first year of classes (1986) took place on a campus at Etobicoke before being moved at Christmas of the same year to a new temporary campus (1996-1990) located on Hollymount Dr in Mississauga.

Due to the large population, the school also took a second shared campus on Rathburn Dr also in Mississauga. They were to stay there until the school building's construction was completed. It was open for the 1990–91 school year.

Due to a school population of over 2600 students for the 1990–91 until 2007–2008 school year, a new school was created and the population was split using a new boundary. All students going into grades 11, 12 and 13 were allowed to finish their high school years at Father Michael Goetz which student in grades 9 and 10 in the new boundary were moved to the new school (St. Francis Xavier Secondary School).

In 2002, the school began an expansion which resulted in a new wing being added.

"Monolith"
During the first term of the 1994–1995 school year, a group of students anonymously published and distributed Monolith, a photocopied monthly newsletter mostly detailing the publishers' grievances with teachers and administration at the school as well as some overall observations regarding growing up in the mid-nineties. The Halloween issue was distributed by costumed, masked students in the cafetorium and included complimentary condoms, as a protest against a biased sex education at the school. The final, Christmas issue was distributed in the school's public restrooms. Some of the students responsible were found and suspended early in the second term. The suspensions proved controversial, with articles published in The Mississauga News and some of the suspended students appearing on CityTV's Speakers' Corner.

"The Green Room"
"The Green Room" is the school's official interscholastic magazine. It is developed by a committee of students who convene under staff supervision. It consists of writers, comic artists, photographers, and layout designers, with two editors. Four issues are released per academic year, which are distributed to every student. It has been criticized by some students as "the most un-green magazine ever" as it supposedly "follows the Yellow Pages business model". In response to this argument, the magazine has chosen to forgo semi-plastic pages in favour of paper pages. As a result of this action, the magazine is now criticized for low production quality.yes and no

Incidents 
 April 25, 2016: At around 9:30am the school engaged in a lockdown after a student was sighted with a firearm on school grounds. Peel Regional Police responded to the incident which resulted in an arrest.
 May 29, 2015: Female students were sent home and told that they were not permitted to wear any types of shorts, this suspension was applied only to female students and no male student was suspended. The school maintained that it was to protect the students from comments made by boys and to ensure their safety, the principal was quoted saying that a student was "asking for it" by wearing shorts. The school also added that the suspension had nothing to do with the Crop Top Day protest in Etobicoke.

Notable alumni
 Cauchy Muamba, CFL player for the British Columbia Lions.
 Hénoc Muamba, CFL player for the Toronto Argonauts.
 Jonathan Hood, former CFL player.
 Greg Wojt, former CFL player.
 Andrew Nicholson, former NBA player.
 Adrian Clarke, CFL player for the British Columbia Lions

See also
List of high schools in Ontario

References

External links
 Official site
 Dufferin-Peel Catholic District School Board Profile

Catholic secondary schools in Ontario
High schools in Mississauga
Educational institutions established in 1990
1990 establishments in Ontario